James Chip Cleary is the American president and principal head of the International Association of Amusement Parks and Attractions. He is a graduate of NYIT.

References

New York Institute of Technology alumni
Living people
American amusement park businesspeople
Year of birth missing (living people)